Plato Alexander Skouras (March 7, 1930 – July 4, 2004) was an American film producer. He was the son of Spyros Skouras.

Skouras worked in theatres and became a production assistant in Hollywood at 20th Century Fox. He became a producer and, later, a restaurant owner.

Select credits
Apache Warrior (1957)
Under Fire (1957)
Sierra Baron (1958)
Villa!! (1958)
Francis of Assisi (1961)

References

External links
 Obituary at New York Times
 Plato Skouras at BFI
 
 Obituary at Variety

American film producers
1930 births
2004 deaths
Yale University alumni